Robert William Howard (born January 29, 1963) is an American professional wrestler, actor, and former auto racer and wrestling trainer/host, better known by the ring name Hardcore Holly or Bob Holly. He is best known for his 16-year career with the World Wrestling Federation/World Wrestling Entertainment (WWF/E) where he also worked under the ring names Thurman "Sparky" Plugg, Bob "Spark Plug" Holly, Bombastic Bob, and "the Big Shot".

After debuting in 1987, Holly worked for World Organization Of Wrestling Smoky Mountain Wrestling and other independent promotions, before joining WWE full-time in 1994. Initially portraying the character of a NASCAR driver, Thurman "Sparky" Plugg, his name was soon changed to Bob "Spark Plug" Holly. In 1998, he formed a team with Bart Gunn, known as The Midnight Express. 

In 1999, Howard became known simply as "Hardcore Holly", developing a stern, punishing persona. Once taking up the Hardcore Holly gimmick, he was joined by on-screen cousins, Crash and Molly. 

In 2002, Hardcore Holly suffered a broken neck during a match with Brock Lesnar, which sidelined him for over a year. Upon his return, he engaged in a major feud with Lesnar for the WWE Championship and minor feuds with other wrestlers, such as Mr. Kennedy and Rob Van Dam. He later formed a tag team combination with Cody Rhodes in 2007. Holly was released from the WWE in 2009, wrestling only intermittently on the independent circuit. He published his autobiography, The Hardcore Truth: The Bob Holly Story, in 2013. 

Championships held by Holly over the course of his career include the WWF/E World Tag Team Championship, NWA World Tag Team Championship, and WWF Hardcore Championship.

Early life
Howard was born in Glendale, California, where he and his older brother were raised by his mother. After his mother remarried, the family relocated to Ventura, California and then to Grants Pass, Oregon, where Howard attended Grants Pass High School. After graduating, Howard worked in a beer warehouse before moving to Mobile, Alabama with the mother of his daughter, Stephanie. Howard spent several years working as a mechanic for Meineke (supplementing his income by boxing in bars) before joining Taylor Wharton as a pipe cutter, where he trained as a welder. Howard later moved to Cowin Equipment, where he worked as a mechanic and welder.

Professional wrestling career

Early career (1987–1990)
Holly trained under Bob Sweetan, Marcelle Pringle, and Rip Tyler, and debuted in 1987 in the Mobile area in the World Organization Of Wrestling promotion where he held titles on and off, including the WOW Tag Team Championship with Ron Starr when they defeated the Rock 'n' Roll Express. 

From there, he wrestled in Memphis and then in the NWA (National Wrestling Alliance) with moderate success.

World Championship Wrestling (1990–1991)
In 1990 Holly began making television appearances in World Championship Wrestling under the name "Bob Holly", being utilized primarily as a jobber. His first match came on July 30 in Gainesville, Georgia, when he was defeated via submission by United States Heavyweight Champion Lex Luger. Holly then wrestled in a six-man match in Marietta, Georgia on August 6, teaming with "Powerhouse" Tim Parker and Brad Bratton against Ric Flair, Arn Anderson and Barry Windham. On August 13 Holly faced Flair in a singles match that aired on World Championship Wrestling, losing via submission. After an absence of several months, he made a final appearance at a World Championship Wrestling taping on January 21 teaming with Dave Johnson in an unsuccessful effort against The Freebirds in a match that aired February 9, 1991.

World Wrestling Federation (1991)
Two months later Holly made his initial appearance in the World Wrestling Federation (WWF). Again, he was portrayed as a jobber using the name "Bob Holly". His sole match was teaming with Mike Sample in a loss to The Bushwhackers on the March 30 edition of WWF Superstars (match was taped on March 11 in Pensacola, Florida).

Smoky Mountain Wrestling (1991–1992)
Holly joined Jim Cornette's new Smoky Mountain Wrestling promotion and made his debut at the company's very first television taping on October 30 in Greenville, South Carolina, defeating Tim Frye. Billed as "Hollywood" Bob Holly, he received a televised push and portrayed a snobbish-street thug, West Coast character. Afterwards he worked for Buck Robley & The NWF out of Louisiana. He teamed with Robert Gibson there as the Rock N Roll Express.

World Wrestling Federation / Entertainment (1994–2009)

Spark Plug (1994–1998)

Holly returned to the WWF on January 11, 1994. His initial gimmick was that of a NASCAR driver turned wrestler called Thurman "Sparky" Plugg, which was quietly changed to Bob "Spark Plug" Holly by the fall of 1994. He competed in the 1994 Royal Rumble match, lasting over 21 minutes.

At the Royal Rumble in January 1995, Holly and the 1–2–3 Kid defeated Bam Bam Bigelow and Tatanka in the finals of a tournament to crown new WWF Tag Team Champions. Their title reign lasted only one day, however, as the next day, on WWF Monday Night Raw, Holly and the Kid lost the tag team title to The Smoking Gunns.

On the May 7, 1995 (taped April 26, 1995) episode of WWF Action Zone, Holly pinned WWF Intercontinental Champion Jeff Jarrett in a title match, but as Jarrett had his foot on the ropes, the decision was overturned and the title vacated. Later on in the show, Jarrett defeated Holly in a rematch for the vacant title after pinning Holly with a roll-up. Holly's title win is not recognized by WWE. Holly then competed in the 1995 King of the Ring tournament, defeating Mantaur to qualify before losing to The Roadie in the quarterfinals. He was then the first WWF pay-per-view opponent of Hunter Hearst Helmsley, losing to him at SummerSlam. At Survivor Series, Holly was a part of the Underdogs team along with Marty Jannetty, Hakushi, and Barry Horowitz. They were defeated by the Body Donnas team of Skip, Doctor of Desire Tom Prichard, Rad Radford, and the 1–2–3 Kid.

Despite lasting nearly 40 minutes in the Royal Rumble, Holly made very few television appearances in the WWF throughout 1996 and 1997.

The Midnight Express and The J.O.B. Squad (1998–1999)

In February 1998, a newly blonde Holly and Bart Gunn joined forces with Jim Cornette as part of Jeff Jarrett's National Wrestling Alliance stable. Holly, renamed "Bombastic Bob", and Gunn, renamed "Bodacious Bart" were known collectively as The Midnight Express. The Midnight Express defeated The Headbangers for the NWA World Tag Team Championship on March 30, 1998 and held the titles until August 14 of that year, when they were defeated by The Border Patrol. They challenged the New Age Outlaws for the World Tag Team Championship at the King of the Ring pay-per-view, but were unsuccessful.

In mid-1998, Holly competed in the WWF Brawl for All, a 16-man shootfighting tournament. He was eliminated in the first round by the eventual winner, Bart Gunn, who defeated him on points; Holly has the distinction of being the only one of Gunn's opponents he was unable to knock out.

In November 1998, Al Snow, Bob Holly and Scorpio united and formed The J.O.B. Squad. During that same month on an edition of Raw, they helped Mankind defeat Ken Shamrock and The Big Boss Man in a triple threat match. In February 1999, Scorpio was released by the WWF while Gillberg was later phased out of storylines and The Blue Meanie allied with Goldust. After dwindling down to only two members, Snow wrestled against himself on an edition of Raw before Holly came down to the ring to prevent Snow from hurting himself, which led to the formal breakup of the J.O.B. Squad. Later that month at St. Valentine's Day Massacre: In Your House, Bob Holly defeated Snow for the WWF Hardcore Championship to permanently end the J.O.B. Squad. A week later on Raw, for his title defense match against former partner Bart Gunn, Holly formally changed his name to Hardcore Holly.

Hardcore Champion and The Holly Cousins (1999–2001)

Holly dropped the championship to Billy Gunn on the March 15, 1999 edition of Raw, but regained the title two weeks later at WrestleMania XV, in a triple threat hardcore match also involving Al Snow. He lost the title to Al Snow at Backlash, and soon began referring to himself as "The Big Shot", feuding with Big Show and Kane.

On the August 16, 1999 edition of Raw, Holly introduced his on-screen "cousin" Crash Holly. They unsuccessfully challenged for the WWF Tag Team Championship at SummerSlam. Though simultaneously arguing over who was the better Holly, they won the WWF Tag Team Championship on the October 18, 1999 edition of Raw, by defeating the Rock 'n' Sock Connection, after Triple H interfered. They lost the titles two weeks later to Mankind and Al Snow on the November 4 edition of SmackDown!. The Holly Cousins and Too Cool defeated Edge, Christian and The Hardy Boyz in a traditional four-on-four elimination match at Survivor Series, where Holly was the lone survivor.

On the November 18, 1999 edition of SmackDown!, Holly challenged The Big Show for the WWF Championship, but was defeated. In early 2000, Hardcore Holly pursued the Intercontinental Championship, losing a match against Chyna due to interference from Chris Jericho. He then lost a Triple Threat Match against Chyna and Jericho for the championship at the Royal Rumble, which was won by Jericho. He lost two more subsequent matches to Jericho for the title, ending their feud.

After Crash Holly won the Hardcore Championship on the February 24, 2000 episode of SmackDown!, the cousins began feuding over the title. Holly won the Hardcore Championship in a "hardcore" 13-man battle royal at WrestleMania 2000. He lost the title back to Crash the following night on Raw. He then sporadically challenged for both the Intercontinental and Hardcore championships the following months. Holly then missed several months of ring time due to a legitimately broken arm, suffered in a match with Kurt Angle on the June 29, 2000 edition of SmackDown!. After his return, later in 2000, another on-screen cousin, Molly Holly was introduced. Holly returned on the November 13, 2000 edition of Raw, where Holly, Crash Holly and The Undertaker defeated Edge, Christian, and Kurt Angle in a six-man tag match. At Survivor Series, Holly faced William Regal for the WWF European Championship but lost by disqualification. Holly got a rematch at the title at Armageddon but was defeated by Regal. At the Royal Rumble, Holly competed in the 30-man Royal Rumble match but was eliminated by The Undertaker. In February, Holly won the Hardcore title three more times, but each time re-lost the title moments later under the "24/7 Hardcore rule." Holly competed in the King of the Ring tournament but lost to Kurt Angle in the first round.

Feud with Brock Lesnar and neck injury (2002–2004)

In early 2002, Howard worked as one of a collection of trainer/hosts for Tough Enough II, a reality competition TV series produced by WWE and MTV where participants underwent professional wrestling training and competed for a contract with WWE.

In 2002, Holly turned heel on SmackDown! and began a short feud with Randy Orton. He then had a minor feud with Kurt Angle after eliminating him from a battle royal, turning him face again. On a September 12, 2002, edition of WWE SmackDown, Holly suffered a broken neck during a match against Brock Lesnar, when he was powerbombed neck first on the mat. He had a thirteen-month hiatus from wrestling after surgery.

While awaiting surgery, Holly made a guest appearance on Tough Enough III. The show caused some controversy when, during the course of a practice match, Howard stiffed a competitor, Matt Cappotelli, leaving him bleeding. Cappotelli later said that there was no ill-feeling between the two because of the incident.

In October 2003, Holly began training at Ohio Valley Wrestling, WWE's developmental territory, in preparation for his return to the main roster. Holly returned at the Survivor Series pay-per-view in November 2003 for revenge. He challenged Lesnar to a match for the WWE Championship at the Royal Rumble, but lost.

Various storylines (2004–2006)
During 2004 and early 2005, he formed short-lived tag teams with Billy Gunn, and later Charlie Haas in the hunt for the WWE Tag Team Championship, but was unsuccessful with both partners. He also failed to claim the WWE Championship from John "Bradshaw" Layfield (JBL) in a hardcore match on the October 14 episode of SmackDown!.

In mid-2005, Holly went into singles competition trying to acquire the United States Championship from Orlando Jordan. After being defeated twice by Jordan, Holly finally managed to pick up a non-title win over Jordan via disqualification on WWE Velocity, which aired on August 6, 2005. Holly then entered a short feud with SmackDown! newcomer, Mr. Kennedy. This feud climaxed on October 9, 2005 at No Mercy, where Kennedy defeated Holly after a Green Bay Plunge.

Holly then underwent several surgeries to repair nagging injuries. He was hospitalized after a staph infection developed in a right arm wound. The infection was possibly career-threatening, as doctors were worried at one point that the arm may have to undergo amputation. The subsequent treatments were a success, however.

ECW championship pursuit (2006–2007)

Holly made a surprise appearance at WWE's ECW house show event on August 21, 2006 in Allentown, Pennsylvania, defeating Balls Mahoney. Holly made his ECW television debut the next night, August 22, appearing in a promo with Paul Heyman, and later attacking Rob Van Dam (RVD) and Danny Doring during a match. Holly, now as a heel, soon joined with Heyman and his other associates to feud with RVD and others.

On September 26, 2006, Holly received 24 stitches from WWE Doctor Ferdinand Rios in his back after suffering a severe laceration during an Extreme Rules match against Rob Van Dam when he landed on the metal railing of a table he was suplexing Van Dam out of the ring and through during an ECW show in Tulsa, Oklahoma. Holly obtained the injury early in the match but continued to wrestle until the match's conclusion when he was pinned. After the match, as he was being helped out of the ring, he received a standing ovation from fans. The legitimate incident caused fans to cheer Holly in the following weeks, leading him to become a face character and a feud with Paul Heyman's other enforcer Test. His second to latest run as a face was short lived as he eventually turned on Rob Van Dam when they were partners in a tag match.

When Sabu was found kayfabe unconscious in the locker room area before the Extreme Elimination Chamber at December to Dismember, Holly was chosen as his replacement. Holly entered with Rob Van Dam as the first of two combatants. He was the second to be eliminated; he was eliminated by Test by a running big boot. Subsequently, he entered into a feud with CM Punk whereby Holly, now a tweener, showed his endurance by surviving Punk's Anaconda Vice submission hold. Holly then gave Punk his first loss in ECW; Punk had been undefeated for half a year. After Test replaced Holly in a match against ECW World Champion Bobby Lashley, Holly vowed he would become champion whether he faced Test or Lashley. Holly then was one of ECW superstars entered in the Royal Rumble, but was eliminated by The Great Khali. Holly soon became the number one contender for Lashley's ECW World Championship and faced off against Lashley, albeit unsuccessfully.

On the April 3 episode of ECW, Holly lost to Snitsky. After the match, Snitsky wedged Holly's arm between the steel steps and repeatedly hit the steps with a steel chair, resulting in a broken arm in the storyline. Holly had surgery on April 16 because of a staph infection and missed around five months.

Alliance with Cody Rhodes and departure (2007–2009)

Holly was drafted back to SmackDown! from ECW on June 17, 2007 as part of the Supplemental Draft. Despite this, he returned to the ring as a member of the Raw brand on September 24, 2007, defeating Cody Rhodes, and starting a "respect" feud in which Holly defeated Rhodes on the two following episodes of Raw. On the October 22 episode of Raw, Holly became a fan favorite by saving Rhodes from the post-match assault of Shelton Benjamin and Charlie Haas. On the October 29 episode of Raw, Holly and Rhodes emerged victorious in a tag team match against Benjamin and Haas. They earned a shot at the World Tag Team Championship by defeating Paul London and Brian Kendrick and The Highlanders in a WWE.com exclusive match after an Alabama Slam. Holly and Rhodes lost their title match, however, against Lance Cade and Trevor Murdoch at Survivor Series.

On December 10, 2007, on the Raw 15th Anniversary episode, Holly along with Rhodes defeated Lance Cade and Trevor Murdoch for the World Tag Team Championship. The following week, Holly and Rhodes retained their title, in their first title defense, against Cade and Murdoch. They successfully defended their title against the teams of Carlito and Santino Marella and Paul London and Brian Kendrick. Holly participated in the 2008 Royal Rumble match and lasted thirteen minutes, but was eliminated by Umaga. On June 29 at Night of Champions, Rhodes turned on Holly by defeating him with Ted DiBiase in a handicap match to crown the new team as champions. This turned out to be his final WWE pay-per-view appearance. After Night of Champions, Holly took time off from WWE television for 7 months. After 7 month hiatus, WWE announced that Holly was released from his WWE contract on January 16, 2009, and ending his 15-year tenure with the company.

Independent circuit (2009–2016)
In May 2009, Holly traveled to England and wrestled for Varsity Pro Wrestling. On May 26, Holly defeated The UK Kid in a Tables, Ladders, and Chairs match during which he sustained a rib injury. Throughout mid-2009, Holly wrestled for National Wrestling Superstars, competing against wrestlers including Danny Demento, Salvatore Sincere, and D. J. Hyde. Holly then took a break from wrestling from 2010 until 2013.

On March 19, 2013, Holly, now bald and sporting a new tattoo, made a one night appearance for Total Nonstop Action Wrestling (TNA) as he took part in a six-man tag team match and teamed with James Storm and Magnus to defeat Aces & Eights (D.O.C., Wes Brisco, and Knux) at the TNA One Night Only event Hardcore Justice 2, which was aired on July 5, this was Holly's only match for TNA. Later that year he would wrestle for Southside Wrestling Entertainment and Preston City Wrestling in the U.K. and for Melbourne City Wrestling in Australia.

On May 7, 2016, Holly wrestled in the Netherlands for Pro Wrestling Showdown. Holly would also spend time in the UK, competing for PCW, Kamikaze Pro, Southside. Holly would also challenge Eddie Ryan for the Pro Wrestling Pride Heavyweight Championship, and Joseph Conners for the IPW:UK World Heavyweight Championship; however he would win neither championship.

Auto racing career
In 1992, Howard began auto racing in Mobile, Alabama at the Mobile International Speedway. Driving a 1974 Chevrolet Malibu, Howard placed fifth in the 1992 season and won the 1993 season.

In 1995, Howard began driving a World Wrestling Federation-sponsored super late model in the All Pro Series in an attempt at cross promotion. After the World Wrestling Federation (WWF) withdrew its sponsorship, WWF chairman Vince McMahon gifted the equipment to Howard.

Personal life
Howard has a daughter named Stephanine from his first marriage. Howard has been married to Linda Kievet since 2010.

Howard's autobiography, titled The Hardcore Truth: The Bob Holly Story was released in the United States on April 1, 2013. Co-authored by former British wrestler Ross Owen Williams, an actor and writer who wrestled Holly in June 2010, it was published by ECW Press.

Championships and accomplishments
Kamikaze Pro
Kamikaze Pro Championship (1 time)
Pro Wrestling Illustrated
PWI ranked him #41 of the top 500 best singles wrestlers in the PWI 500 in 2000
PWI ranked him #391 of the 500 best singles wrestlers of the PWI Years in 2003
Under the Lights
UTL Lights Out Championship (1 time)
World Wrestling Federation / Entertainment
NWA World Tag Team Championship (1 time) – with Bodacious Bart
WWF Hardcore Championship (6 times)
WWF/E World Tag Team Championship (3 times) – with The 1–2–3 Kid (1), Crash Holly (1) and Cody Rhodes (1)
WWF World Tag Team Championship Tournament (1995) – with The 1-2-3 Kid 
World Wrestling Organization
WWO Tag Team Championship (1 time) – with Ron Starr
WWO United States Heavyweight Championship (1 time)

Bibliography
The Hardcore Truth: The Bob Holly Story (2013) (with Ross Williams)

Filmography

References

External links

 The Hardcore Truth at Google Books
 
 
 
 

1963 births
American male film actors
American male professional wrestlers
American racing drivers
Living people
Professional wrestlers from California
Professional wrestling trainers
Racing drivers from California
Sportspeople from Glendale, California
WWF/WWE Hardcore Champions
20th-century professional wrestlers
21st-century professional wrestlers
NWA World Tag Team Champions